The Tamien people (also spelled as Tamyen, Thamien) are one of eight linguistic divisions of the Ohlone (Costanoan) people groups of Native Americans who live in Northern California. The Tamien traditionally lived throughout the Santa Clara Valley. The use of the name Tamien is on record as early as 1777, it comes from the Ohlone name for the location of the first Mission Santa Clara (Mission Santa Clara de Tamine) on the Guadalupe River. Father Pena mentioned in a letter to Junipero Serra that the area around the mission was called Thamien by the native people.  The missionary fathers erected the mission on January 17, 1777 at the native village of So-co-is-u-ka.

Language
Traditionally, the Tamien people spoke the Tamien language, a Northern Ohlone language, which ceased to be spoken since possibly the early 19th century. "Tamyen", also called Santa Clara Costanoan, has been extended to mean the Native people of Santa Clara Valley, as well as the language they spoke. Tamien is listed as one of eight Costanoan language dialects in the Utian family, although the legitimacy of the Utian genetic group is contested. Tamien was the primary language of the Native people living at the first and second Mission Santa Clara (both founded in 1777). Linguistically, it is thought that Chochenyo, Tamyen and Ramaytush are dialects of a single language. However, this has not been proven and Chochenyo, Tamien, and Ramaytush remain separate political tribes.

Territory
Tamien territory extends over most of the present day Santa Clara County, California, and was bordered by communities that spoke other Ohlone languages: Ramaytush to the northwest on the San Francisco Peninsula, Chochenyo, East Bay, Mutsun, south of San Martin, and the Akwaswas to the southwest. Tamien villages were not "tribelets" but a Nation of Tamien speaking villages. 

Tamien Nation is often mislabeled as "Ohlone." There is no historic Ohlone Tribe. The term was coined by anthropologist based on two theories, (1) the mispronunciation of the Bay Miwok word, "Wolwolum" meaning "western people" or (2) named after the "Oljon" village on the lower San Gregorio Creek and Pescadero Creek. Regardless of its origin, Tribes of the San Francisco and Monterey Bay Area were separate independent Nations.  

During the era of Spanish missions in California, the Tamien people's lives changed with the Mission Santa Clara built in their region. Most moved into one of these missions and were baptized, lived and educated to be Catholic neophytes, also known as Mission Indians, until the mission was secularized by the Mexican Government in 1833. A large majority of the Tamien died from disease and murder in the missions, but surviving families remained intact migrating to Santa Cruz after their lands were granted to Spanish and Mexican Immigrants.  Tamien people later intermarried with Mexican land owners for safety, security, and a place for the Tamien community to live and work. When the American Government regranted Mexican land grants to white immigrants, the Tamien people were once again displaced and migrated to the San Joaquin Valley where hundreds of Tamien people continue to reside.

Today, the Tamien and other "Ohlone" Nations are more distinct than ever with different languages, social and political structures, religion, and value systems. Tamien Nation is currently preparing a petition for U.S. Federal Acknowledgement and is listed as the historic Tribe with the California State Native American Heritage Commission. The Tamien Nation , which is active in Santa Clara and southern San Mateo Counties protecting their sacred lands, cultural landscapes, environment, and resources. Among other goals, the Tamien Nation seeks to reacquire unceded lands that were stolen from them by the Spanish, Mexicans, and then the Americans.

Tribes and villages
The Tamyen (Tamien, Thamien) people are associated with the original site of Mission Santa Clara (Mission Santa Clara de Thamien) on the Guadalupe River, 1777. The entire Santa Clara Valley was populated with dozens of Tamien speaking villages, several on Coyote Creek.

See also
 Ohlone tribes and villages in Santa Clara Valley
 Namesakes:
 Tamien Station
 Tamien, San Jose

Notes

References
 Hylkema, Mark. "Tamien Station Archeological Project", published by Bean, Lowell John, editor, in The Ohlone: Past and Present Native Americans of the San Francisco Bay Region. Menlo Park, CA: Ballena Press Publication, 1994.  (pages 249–270).
 Levy, Richard. 1978. Costanoan, in Handbook of North American Indians, vol. 8 (California). William C. Sturtevant, and Robert F. Heizer, eds. Washington, DC: Smithsonian Institution, 1978.  / 0160045754, pages 485–495.
 Milliken, Randall. A Time of Little Choice: The Disintegration of Tribal Culture in the San Francisco Bay Area 1769-1910 Menlo Park, CA: Ballena Press Publication, 1995.  (alk. paper)
 Teixeira, Lauren. The Costanoan/Ohlone Indians of the San Francisco and Monterey Bay Area, A Research Guide. Menlo Park, CA: Ballena Press Publication, 1997. .

External links
 Tamien Nation
 Muwekma Ohlone
 Muwekma request for federal tribal recognition Court opinion 9/21/06

Ohlone
California Mission Indians
History of San Jose, California
History of Santa Clara County, California